Steve Zolotow (born March 30, 1945) is an American businessman and professional poker player from Las Vegas, Nevada.  He has won two bracelets at the World Series of Poker.  He was one of the regulars at the famed Mayfair Club while he lived in New York City.

New York Years
Zolotow was born on March 30, 1945, in New York City. He lived in New York City for many years before becoming a professional poker player and moving to Las Vegas. He worked as a businessman, and owns several bars and restaurants in New York City.

He also discovered poker while living in New York and became a regular player at the Mayfair club along with now well-known poker professionals like Howard Lederer, Dan Harrington, Jay Heimowitz, and Erik Seidel, among others.

Poker career
Zolotow has been on the poker circuit since 1988, when he finished in 5th place in that year's World Series of Poker $2500 Pot Limit Omaha tournament.

In the years to come, he would earn bracelets for winning the 1995 Chinese Poker tournament (which also featured Doyle Brunson and Howard Lederer), and for winning the 2001 $3000 Pot Limit Hold'em tournament (which also featured John Juanda, Tom McEvoy, Kathy Liebert, Chris Ferguson and Scotty Nguyen.)

Apart from his successes at the World Series, his biggest cash win to date came for a 4th place on the World Poker Tour's Season 2 PartyPoker.com Million Cruise, which saw him sharing a final table with Scotty Nguyen, Barry Greenstein, Daniel Negreanu and eventual winner Erick Lindgren. Zolotow won $259,684 from the tournament's prize pool.

In 2008, Zolotow competed on NBC's Poker After Dark show which reunited six players from the Mayfair Club.  The tournament included Zolotow and fellow professional poker players Howard Lederer, Mickey Appleman, Dan Harrington, Jay Heimowitz, and former Mayfair club owner, Mike Shichtman.  Zolotow finished in fourth place, and Heimowitz won the tournament and winner-take-all prize of $120,000.

As of 2013, his total live tournament winnings exceed $2,200,000. His 49 cashes at the WSOP account for over $1,100,000 of those winnings.

World Series of Poker bracelets

References

1945 births
Living people
Businesspeople from New York City
People from the Las Vegas Valley
American restaurateurs
American gambling writers
American male non-fiction writers
20th-century American Jews
American poker players
World Series of Poker bracelet winners
21st-century American Jews